Rayalaseema Thermal Power Station is located at Yerraguntla (Md) in  Kadapa(Dist) in Andhra Pradesh. The power plant is one of the coal based power plants of APGENCO.

Capacity 
The Thermal Power Station has a capacity of 1650 MW; 5 units of 210 MW each and 1 units of 600 MW.

Power Plant
Rayalaseema Thermal Power Plant was developed under 3 stages namely stage I,II, III and IV.
The station is performing well in the recent years by achieving high plant load factor. It stood first in country during 98–99, 2002–03, 2003–04 and second during 99–2000, 2001–02.
The station has received Meritorious productivity awards for six consecutive years and Incentive award for seven consecutive years. BHEL commissioned stage IV unit 1x600MW in March 2018 leading to total installed capacity of RTPP to 1650MW.

References 

Coal-fired power stations in Andhra Pradesh
Buildings and structures in Kadapa district
1994 establishments in Andhra Pradesh
Energy infrastructure completed in 1994
20th-century architecture in India